Goshan is a village in Drass tehsil in Kargil district of the Indian union territory of Ladakh. The village is located 77 kilometres from the district headquarters Kargil.

Demographics
According to the 2011 census of India, Goshan had 189 households. The literacy rate of Goshan village is 76.49%. In Goshan, Male literacy stands at 85.07% while the female literacy rate was 67.13%.

Transport

Road
Goshan is connected by road to other places in Ladakh and India by the Srinagar–Leh Highway or the NH 1.

Rail
The nearest railway stations to Goshan are Sopore railway station and Srinagar railway station located at a distance of 178 kilometres and 185 kilometres. The nearest major railway station is Jammu Tawi railway station located at a distance of 445 kilometres.

Air
The nearest airport is located in Kargil at a distance of 85 kilometres but it is currently non-operational. The next nearest major airports are Srinagar International Airport and Leh Airport located at a distance of 183 kilometres and 292 kilometres.

See also
Ladakh
Kargil
Drass

References

Villages in Drass tehsil